Girolamo de Franchis (1581 – January 1635) was a Roman Catholic prelate who served as Archbishop of Capua (1634–1635) and Bishop of Nardò (1617–1634).

Biography
Girolamo de Franchis was born in Naples, Italy in 1581. On 13 November 1617, he was appointed during the papacy of Pope Paul V as Bishop of Nardò. On 26 November 1617, he was consecrated bishop by Ladislao d'Aquino, Bishop of Venafro, with Antonio d'Aquino, Bishop of Sarno, and Innico Siscara, Bishop of Anglona-Tursi, serving as co-consecrators. On 27 November 1634, he was appointed during the papacy of Pope Urban VIII as Archbishop of Capua. He served as Archbishop of Capua until his death in January 1635.

While bishop, Franchis was the principal co-consecrator of Placido Padiglia, Bishop of Lavello (1627).

References

External links and additional sources
 (for Chronology of Bishops) 
(for Chronology of Bishops) 
 (for Chronology of Bishops) 
 (for Chronology of Bishops) 

17th-century Italian Roman Catholic archbishops
Bishops appointed by Pope Paul V
Bishops appointed by Pope Urban VIII
1581 births
1635 deaths